Brachylaena rotundata is an occasionally deciduous Southern African shrub or small tree growing to some 8m in height and of the family Asteraceae. It occurs in eastern Botswana, Transvaal, Mozambique, Zambia and Zimbabwe, growing in open woodland, on rocky koppies and slopes, and on stream banks. Kew accepts Brachylaena rotundata S. Moore as a species while 'Flora of Mozambique' treats it as a variety of Brachylaena discolor DC. It bears attractive foliage, green on the upper surface and silver-grey on the lower, leaves turning slightly reddish in autumn.

This species produces a dense and strong creamy-brown timber, but not of any useful size or straightness.

References

External links
SANBI
JSTOR
Flowers

rotundata